Mise à jour is the fourth studio album by French singer M. Pokora, released on 23 August 2010. The lead single "Juste une photo de toi" was released on June 7.

The second French edition of the album entitled Mise à Jour Version 2.0 provided another single, "À nos actes manqués", which achieved success in France and Belgium.

The international edition of Mise à Jour entitled Updated contains English versions of the album and was released on 14 March 2011.

Track listing

Charts

Weekly charts

Year-end charts

Release history

Updated

Updated is the international version of Mise à Jour released on 14 March 2011 containing English versions of the songs of the album.

Two singles were released from the album: "Oblivion" in December 2010 and "Finally Found Ya" in May 2011

Track list

Mise à Jour Version 2.0

On April 14, 2011 many months of the release of the initial album on 23 August 2010, M. Pokora released Mise à jour Version 2.0 and as a physical release starting 18 April 2011. Visually the CD was dubbed "the blue version" with the original August 2010 dubbed "the green version".

Version 2.0 contains the full 14 titles of the standard version, but also in addition "À nos actes manqués" a remake of a Goldman/Fredericks/Jones classic, the yet unpublished "Si on échangeait les rôles", three songs in English language taken from the album "Updated".

Track list

Notes

2010 albums
M. Pokora albums